"Masterpiece" is the debut single by Italian musician Gazebo, released in September 1982 as the first single from his debut studio album, Gazebo (1983). The song was written by Mazzolini, Paul Micioni and Pierluigi Giombini, and produced by Paul Peter Micioni and Roberto Fusar Poli. It reached the top 10 in Italy, peaking at No. 2. The song also charted in Switzerland and West Germany, peaking at No. 5 and No. 35, respectively.

Track listing and formats 

 Italian 7-inch single

A. "Masterpiece" – 4:10
B. "Masterpiece (Instrumental)" – 4:30

 Italian 12-inch single

A. "Masterpiece" – 9:30
B. "Masterpiece (Instrumental)" – 12:45

Charts

References 

1982 songs
1982 debut singles
Baby Records singles
Gazebo (musician) songs
Songs with music by Pierluigi Giombini
Songs written by Gazebo (musician)